Imaging is the representation or reproduction of an object's form; especially a visual representation (i.e., the formation of an image).

Imaging technology is the application of materials and methods to create, preserve, or duplicate images. 

Imaging science is a multidisciplinary field concerned with the generation, collection, duplication, analysis, modification, and visualization of images, including imaging things that the human eye cannot detect. As an evolving field it includes research and researchers from physics, mathematics, electrical engineering, computer vision, computer science, and perceptual psychology.

Imager are imaging sensors.

Imaging chain
The foundation of imaging science as a discipline is the "imaging chain" – a conceptual model describing all of the factors which must be considered when developing a system for creating visual renderings (images).  In general, the links of the imaging chain include:

 The human visual system.  Designers must also consider the psychophysical processes which take place in human beings as they make sense of information received through the visual system.
 The subject of the image.  When developing an imaging system, designers must consider the observables associated with the subjects which will be imaged.  These observables generally take the form of emitted or reflected energy, such as electromagnetic energy or mechanical energy.
 The capture device.  Once the observables associated with the subject are characterized, designers can then identify and integrate the technologies needed to capture those observables.  For example, in the case of consumer digital cameras, those technologies include optics for collecting energy in the visible portion of the electromagnetic spectrum, and electronic detectors for converting the electromagnetic energy into an electronic signal.
 The processor.  For all digital imaging systems, the electronic signals produced by the capture device must be manipulated by an algorithm which formats the signals so they can be displayed as an image.  In practice, there are often multiple processors involved in the creation of a digital image.
 The display.  The display takes the electronic signals which have been manipulated by the processor and renders them on some visual medium.  Examples include paper (for printed, or "hard copy" images), television, computer monitor, or projector.

Note that some imaging scientists will include additional "links" in their description of the imaging chain.  For example, some will include the "source" of the energy which "illuminates" or interacts with the subject of the image.  Others will include storage and/or transmission systems.

Subfields
Subfields within imaging science include:  image processing, computer vision, 3D computer graphics, animations, atmospheric optics, astronomical imaging, biological imaging, digital image restoration, digital imaging, color science, digital photography, holography, magnetic resonance imaging, medical imaging, microdensitometry, optics, photography, remote sensing,  radar imaging,  radiometry, silver halide, ultrasound imaging, photoacoustic imaging, thermal imaging, visual perception, and various printing technologies.

Methodologies 
 Acoustic imaging
 Coherent imaging uses an active coherent illumination source, such as in radar, synthetic aperture radar (SAR), medical ultrasound and optical coherence tomography; non-coherent imaging systems include fluorescent microscopes, optical microscopes, and telescopes. 
 Chemical imaging, the simultaneous measurement of spectra and pictures
 Digital imaging, creating digital images, generally by scanning or through digital photography
 Disk image, a file which contains the exact content of a data storage medium
 Document imaging, replicating documents commonly used in business
 Geophysical imaging
 Industrial process imaging
 Medical imaging, creating images of the human body or parts of it, to diagnose or examine disease
 Medical optical imaging
 Magnetic resonance imaging
 Magneto-Acousto-Electrical Tomography (MAET), imaging modality to image the electrical conductivity of biological tissues
 Molecular imaging
 Radar imaging, or imaging radar, for obtaining an image of an object, not just its location and speed
 Range imaging, for obtaining images with depth information
 Reprography, reproduction of graphics through electrical and mechanical means
 Cinematography
 Photography, the process of creating still images
 Xerography, the method of photocopying
 Speckle imaging, a method of shift-and-add for astronomical imaging
 Stereo imaging, an aspect of sound recording and reproduction concerning spatial locations of the performers
 Thermography, infrared imaging
Tactile imaging, also known as elastography

Examples

Imaging technology materials and methods include:
Computer graphics
Virtual camera system used in computer and video games and virtual cinematography
Microfilm and Micrographics
Visual arts
Etching
Drawing and Technical drawing
Film
Painting
Photography
Multiple-camera setup enables stereoscopy and stereophotogrammetry
Light-field camera (basically refocusable photography)
Printmaking
Sculpture
Infrared
Radar imagery
Ultrasound
Multi-spectral image
Electro-optical sensor
Charge-coupled device
Ground-penetrating radar
Electron microscope
Imagery analysis
Medical radiography
Industrial radiography
LIDAR
Image scanner
Structured-light 3D scanner

See also 

 Image development (disambiguation)
 Image processing
 Nonimaging optics
 Society for Imaging Science and Technology
 The Imaging Science Journal

References

Further reading
Harrison H. Barrett and Kyle J. Myers, Foundations of Image Science (John Wiley & Sons, 2004) 
Ronald N. Bracewell, Fourier Analysis and Imaging (Kluwer Academic, 2003) 
Roger L. Easton, Jr., Fourier Methods in Imaging (John Wiley & Sons, 2010)  DOI 10.1002/9780470660102
Robert D. Fiete, Modeling the Imaging Chain of Digital Cameras (SPIE Press, 2010)

External links
 Carlson Center for Imaging Science at RIT Research center that offers B.S., M.S., and Ph.D. degrees in Imaging Science.
 The University of Arizona College of Optical Sciences offers an image science track for the M.S and Ph.D. degree in optical sciences.
 Science de l'image et des médias numériques Bachelor of image science and digital media unique in Canada.
 Image Sciences Institute, Utrecht, Netherlands Utrecht University Institute for Image Sciences - focuses on fundamental and applied research in specifically medical image processing and acquisition.
  Vanderbilt University Institute of Imaging Science - dedicated to using imaging to improve health-care and for advancing knowledge in the biological sciences.